Jahn Brochmann Halvorsen (23 November 1916 – 13 May 1976) was a Norwegian diplomat.

He was born in Hadsel and took the cand.oecon. degree in economics. He was hired in the Ministry of Foreign Affairs in 1951. He was a councillor at the Norwegian NATO and OEEC embassy in Paris from 1955 to 1960 and a deputy under-secretary of state in the Ministry of Foreign Affairs from 1960 to 1965. He served as the Norwegian ambassador to Belgium—and also Luxembourg and the European Community—from 1965 to 1973, and then to France from 1973 to his death. He died in May 1976 in Paris.

Halvorsen was decorated as a Commander of the Order of St. Olav and held the War Medal.

References

1916 births
1976 deaths
People from Hadsel
Norwegian civil servants
Ambassadors of Norway to Belgium
Ambassadors of Norway to Luxembourg
Ambassadors of Norway to France